Bakumatsu-den refers to something taking place in the Bakumatsu period. It may refer to:

Bakumatsuden, a manga by Ken Ishikawa
Fu-un Bakumatsu-den
Mouse Bakumatsu-den